The Alameda Belt Line  was incorporated on January 12, 1925, to take over about  of trackage constructed by the city of Alameda, California, on Clement Avenue in 1918. The company acquired the  property on February 17, 1926, and was jointly owned by the Western Pacific Railroad and the Atchison, Topeka and Santa Fe Railway. Due to mergers, it was eventually jointly owned and operated by the BNSF Railway and Union Pacific Railroad.

The ABL last operated in 1998, when its major shipper, a Del Monte cannery, closed. The Union Pacific then operated over the line through trackage rights to serve one remaining shipper until late 2001.  The final locomotive on the line was leased to the Central California Traction Company in Stockton, California.

On January 28, 1999, the land was sold to a developer who planned to build approximately 200 homes on the former rail yard. The city of Alameda went to court to get the land returned to the city, in order to turn the property into a public park, and won, per a provision in the original 1920s contract which gave the city the right to repurchase the land at the original sale price of $30,000. The judge's ruling put the city's purchase price at $966,027, significantly less than the $18 million sale price to the developer. , only a few pieces of its trackage still remain in place.  Most rails have been removed or paved over.

The line was formally abandoned in 2012.

For much of its later history, the ABL was operated in concert with the Oakland Terminal Railway.

References

External links
Interstate Commerce Commission, Valuation Docket No. 1167: Alameda Belt Line, decided May 31, 1933 

Defunct California railroads
Railway companies established in 1925
Railway companies disestablished in 2007
BNSF Railway lines
Union Pacific Railroad lines
Western Pacific Railroad
Atchison, Topeka and Santa Fe Railway
American companies established in 1925
Closed railway lines in the United States
Atchison,_Topeka_and_Santa_Fe_Railway_lines